Lupinus lyallii, common names of which are dwarf mountain lupine, Lobb's lupine, and Lobb's tidy lupine, is a species of flowering plant from the order of Lamiales native to North America.

Distribution
It can be found in California and elsewhere in western North America.

References

External links

lyallii
Flora of British Columbia
Flora of the Western United States
Flora without expected TNC conservation status